Robert Dalton (by 1533 – 1567 or later), of Carlisle, Cumberland, was an English politician.

He was Mayor of Carlisle for 1554 and 1566–67 and elected a Member (MP) of the Parliament of England for Carlisle in 1558.

References

Year of death missing
Politicians from Carlisle, Cumbria
English MPs 1558
Year of birth uncertain
Mayors of Carlisle, Cumbria